Municipalities, in Peru, are the government organizations that govern the provinces and districts of that country. 


Classification
According to the Base law of Municipalities, these entities are classified in to Provincial Municipalities and District Municipalities. The provincial municipalities also have functions pertaining to the provincial seat which is the capital district. Rural municipalities (those whose seat has an urban population less than 50% the total) receive different classification.

Structure
They are composed of two entities, the council and the mayor. The council, made up of the mayor and elected officials, is normative and. The mayor's office however, is the executive power.

Election of authorities
The election of the mayor and council is held by universal suffrage for a period of three years. The number of council members is defined by the National Jury of Elections according to Laws of Municipal Elections.

References

Government of Peru
Subdivisions of Peru

es:Municipalidades del Perú